Simfibrate (JAN/INN; trade name Cholesolvin) is a fibrate that has been used for the treatment of hyperlipidemia. The substance is a double ester of clofibric acid with 1,3-propanediol which is cleaved in the body to one molecule of 1,3-propanediol and two molecules of clofibric acid which is the true lipid-lowering agent.

References 

Chloroarenes
2-Methyl-2-phenoxypropanoic acid derivatives